Giovanni Perugini (born 10 October 1945) is an Italian modern pentathlete. He competed at the 1972 Summer Olympics.

References

External links
 

1945 births
Living people
Italian male modern pentathletes
Olympic modern pentathletes of Italy
Modern pentathletes at the 1972 Summer Olympics
People from Città di Castello
Sportspeople from the Province of Perugia
20th-century Italian people